"Do Me!" is a song by American musical group Bell Biv DeVoe. The song was released in 1990 as the second single from the group's debut album, Poison (1990). A remix is included on the group's WBBD-Bootcity!: The Remix Album, released in 1991. "Do Me!" peaked at number three on the US Billboard Hot 100 chart and number eight in New Zealand while also charting in Australia, Canada, and the United Kingdom.

Composition
According to Billboard, the song is about sex.

Release and reception
In June 1990, "Do Me!" entered the US Billboard Hot 100 singles chart at number 92. In September, the song reached number three, tying previous single "Poison" as Bell Biv DeVoe's biggest hit on the Hot 100. Both songs remained on the chart for 22 weeks. Elsewhere, the single peaked at number four on the Hot Black Singles chart and number six on the Hot Dance Club Songs chart. The song ranked at number 11 on the Billboard Year-End chart for 1990.

Legacy
Davitt Sigerson called the song a "landmark in priapic obsession," and added, "If the true spirit of the male love jones could speak, its words would be B.B.D.'s: 'Slap it up, flip it, rub it down, oh no!'"

Track listings
7-inch vinyl (US, UK)
 "Do Me!" — 4:33
 "Do Me!" (instrumental) — 4:33

12-inch vinyl (US)
 "Do Me!" (Mentality Hip Hop remix) — 8:53
 "Do Me!" (East Coast Mental mix) — 5:37
 "Do Me!" (Smoothed Out version) — 3:15

CD maxi single (US)
 "Do Me!" (Mentality Hip Hop remix) — 8:53
 "Do Me!" (East Coast Mental mix) — 5:37
 "Do Me!" (Smoothed Out version) — 3:15
 "Do Me!" (Mental mix) — 6:17

Charts

Weekly charts

Year-end charts

Release history

In popular culture

"Do Me!" was featured during a scene in the 2002 romantic comedy film 40 Days and 40 Nights and a second season episode of the television series Pose. A parody of the song by cover band and comedy act Richard Cheese and Lounge Against the Machine appears on their 2005 album Aperitif for Destruction. The song was covered by "Weird Al" Yankovic for his polka medley "Polka Your Eyes Out" from his 1992 album Off the Deep End. TV star Jensen Ackles sang this song in the season three gag reel of Supernatural.

References

1990 singles
1990 songs
Bell Biv DeVoe songs
MCA Records singles
Songs written by Busta Rhymes
Songs written by Michael Bivins
Songs written by Ricky Bell (singer)
Songs written by Ronnie DeVoe